The Immortal Draw is a chess game played in 1872 in Vienna by Carl Hamppe and Philipp Meitner. This game is the main claim to fame of both Hamppe and Meitner, and has been reprinted widely. The variation of the Vienna Game it uses was named the Hamppe–Meitner Variation in honour of the two players. These games, with their rapid attacks and counterattacks, are often entertaining to review even if some of the moves would no longer be considered best by today's standards. 

In the game, Black sacrifices huge amounts of material to drive the white king from its  and attempt to force checkmate, but White spectacularly manages to force a draw by perpetual check.

The game itself has often been replayed as a prearranged draw. Its motif of a bishop sacrifice in response to an early knight attack occurs in other lines as well.

Annotated game
White: Carl Hamppe  Black: Philipp Meitner  Opening: Vienna Game (ECO C25)

1. e4 e5 2. Nc3
The Vienna Game, an opening which Hamppe made major contributions to, giving his name to two variations in the Vienna Gambit.

2... Bc5
2...Nf6 is more usual. The move played is offbeat but .

3. Na4
Better would be 3.Nf3 d6 4.d4 and White has a slight advantage.

3... Bxf2+
The  3...Be7 is better and less risky, especially since the move played may in fact lead to a win for White with best play.  A bishop sacrifice is commonly seen in reply to an early knight attack in various lines, including this one.

4. Kxf2
.

4... Qh4+ 5. Ke3
Forced, although after 5.g3 black would need to improve on 5...Qxe4 6.Qe2 Qxh1 7.Qxe5+ Kf8 8.Qxc7 Qxh2+ 9.Bg2 Nc6 10.Qd6+ Nce7 11.d3 Qh5 12.Bd2 Nf6 13.Re1 Ng4+ 14.Kf1 Nh2+ 15.Kf2 etc.

5... Qf4+ 6. Kd3 d5 7. Kc3!
Although 7.Qe1 is usually given as a refutation of this line, with 7...dxe4+ 8.Kc3 e3?! 9.Kb3! Be6+ 10.Ka3 where Black has nothing left, Black need not play 7...dxe4+?, and in fact better is 7...Nf6! (Schiller's move) 8.g3! dxe4+ 9.Kc3 Qg4 10.Bh3 Nd5+ 11.Kb3 Nc6 (11...Qg6!? is unclear) 12.Bxg4! Na5+ 13.Ka3 Nc4+ 14.Kb3 Na5+ with an  position.

7... Qxe4 8. Kb3
Perhaps better for White than this curious king move would be 8.d4!? exd4+ 9.Qxd4!! Qe1+ 10.Bd2! Qxa1 11.Nf3 Qxa2 (an alternative is 11...Nc6!? 12.Qxg7 Be6 13.Nc5! 0-0-0 14.Nxe6 fxe6 15.Qxh8 Qxa2 16.Bg5 where White has a large advantage) 12.Qxg7 Qxa4 13.Qxh8 d4+ 14.Nxd4 Qa5+ 15.Kb3 Qxd2 16.Qxg8+ Ke7 17.Qxc8 Qxd4 18.Bc4! and White has a winning advantage, but still must find several difficult moves.

8... Na6
Threatening 9...Qb4.

9. a3? (diagram)
This move is a crucial mistake, after which Black forces the draw in a breathtaking manner. White can win here more easily than at the previous move with 9.d4! exd4 10.Bxa6 bxa6 11.Nc5 or 9.c3! Bd7 10.Ka3 b5 11.d4 bxa4 12.Bxa6 Qxg2 13.Qf3! Qg6 14.Qxd5 Bc6 15.Bb5.

9... Qxa4+!!
A spectacular queen sacrifice, preventing White from playing Nc3 and Ka2, after which Black has insufficient compensation for his material disadvantage. The move forces the draw that follows.

10. Kxa4 Nc5+ 11. Kb4
11.Kb5 still leads to a draw after 11...Ne7!! 12.Qh5! a5 13.Qxe5 Na6 14.Kxa5 Nb8+ 15.Kb4 Nbc6+ with equality. However, there is 12.c4! d4 13.Kxc5 a5 14.Qa4+ Kd8 15.Qxa5 Rxa5+ 16.Kb4 Nc6+ 17.Kb3 b5 18.d3 bxc4+ 19.dxc4 e4 20.Bd2 where complications favor white

11... a5+ 12. Kxc5
12.Kc3 has been suggested as a means to avoid the draw, but loses after 12...d4+ 13.Kc4 Be6+!! (13...b6? is unclear) 14.Kxc5 Nf6! (threatening mate in three with 15...Nd7+ 16.Kb5 c6+ 17.Ka4 Nc5# or Nb6#) and White cannot avoid checkmate or material loss: 15.Bb5+ Ke7 (threatens 16...Ne4#) 16.Qf3 c6 (threatens 17...Nd7#) 17.Bxc6 (Qxf6+ gxf6 held out longer, though still hopeless) 17...Rhc8 (threatens 18...Nd7+ 19.Kb5 bxc6+ 20.Qxc6 and mate in five) 18.Kb6 bxc6 (threatens 19...Nd7+ 20.Kb7 Rab8+! 21.Ka6 Nc5+ 22.Kxa5 Rb5#) 19.Qxf6+ and mate in eight follows. Every move in the game after 12.Kxc5 is forced.

12... Ne7!
Threatens 13...b6+ with ...Bd7# to follow.

13. Bb5+ Kd8 14. Bc6!!
The only move that avoids checkmate.

14... b6+
Not 14...bxc6? and the white king can no longer be mated.

15. Kb5 Nxc6 16. Kxc6
Not 16.c3 Nd4+! 17.cxd4 Bd7#.

16... Bb7+! 17. Kb5!
Not 17.Kxb7?? Kd7! 18.Qg4+ Kd6! and 19...Rhb8# cannot be prevented.

17... Ba6+ 18. Kc6
Not 18.Ka4?? Bc4! and 19...b5# cannot be prevented.

18... Bb7+ 
Draw agreed.

See also
Immortal Game
Immortal Zugzwang Game
List of chess games

References

Chess games
1872 in chess
1872 in Austria-Hungary
Nicknamed sporting events